Agonopterix ferocella is a moth of the family Depressariidae. It is found in southern France, Italy, Ukraine and Russia.

The larvae feed on Cirsium ferox and Echinops species. They initially mine the leaves of their host plant. Later, they vacate the mine and window feed at the underside of the leaf. Larvae can be found from June to July.

References

Moths described in 1910
Agonopterix
Moths of Europe
Taxa named by Pierre Chrétien